The 2006 National League Championship Series (NLCS), the second round of the 2006 National League playoffs, began on October 12 and ended on October 19; it was scheduled to begin on October 11, but was postponed a day because of inclement weather. The St. Louis Cardinals defeated the heavily favored New York Mets in seven games to advance to the 2006 World Series against the Detroit Tigers.

The Cardinals and the Mets took the series to the limit, reaching the 9th inning of Game 7 tied at 1–1. The Cardinals took the lead with Yadier Molina's two-run home run off Mets reliever Aaron Heilman in the 9th to put his team ahead, 3–1. Adam Wainwright would then hold the Mets scoreless in the bottom of the 9th to give St. Louis their second pennant in three years and 17th in club history, placing them one behind the New York/San Francisco Giants and the Brooklyn/Los Angeles Dodgers for most in NL modern history (since 1903). The Cardinals were making their third consecutive appearance in the NLCS; manager Tony La Russa, who led St. Louis to the 2004 pennant and previously won AL titles with the Oakland Athletics from 1988–90, became the first manager in history to win multiple pennants in both leagues.

The Mets, handicapped after season-ending injuries to Pedro Martínez and Orlando Hernández, qualified for postseason play for the first time since 2000. They defeated the Los Angeles Dodgers three games to none in the NL Division Series, while the Cardinals defeated the San Diego Padres three games to one. The Mets had home-field advantage due to their better record in the regular season (the Mets were 97–65, the Cardinals 83–78). The Mets and Cardinals previously met in the 2000 NLCS, which the Mets won in five games.

The Cardinals would go on to defeat the Detroit Tigers in the World Series in five games.

Summary

New York Mets vs. St. Louis Cardinals

†: Game 1 was postponed due to rain on October 11. Game 2 was subsequently pushed back a day as well.
‡: Game 5 was postponed due to rain on October 16.

Game summaries

Game 1
Thursday, October 12, 2006 at Shea Stadium in Queens, New York

On a game pushed back a day by rain, both pitchers pitched magnificently. Tom Glavine earned the win with seven innings of shutout baseball. The game's only runs came on a two-run homer by Carlos Beltrán off losing pitcher Jeff Weaver in the sixth following a two-out single by Paul Lo Duca. Glavine was aided by stellar defense, as the Mets turned two double plays. In the third inning, with runners on first and second, third baseman David Wright caught a line drive off the bat of David Eckstein and threw to second to double up Yadier Molina. In the following inning, Juan Encarnación flied out to shallow center to Beltrán, who threw to first on the run to double up Albert Pujols, who went 0-for-3 with a walk. Left fielder Endy Chávez also made an excellent diving play on a flare hit by Ronnie Belliard. He replaced Cliff Floyd, who left in the second inning when he reaggravated his injured Achilles tendon.

Following the game, Albert Pujols was controversially critical of Glavine's performance, saying that the Cards would have dominated him if they were on their "A" game. His exact words were:
 		
"He wasn't good. He wasn't good at all ... I think we hit the ball hard, we didn't get some breaks. I say he wasn't good at all. We just didn't get some opportunities and that's it.... [He did the] same thing that he always does. Throw a changeup, fastball and that was it." 
 		 	
Pujols' comments drew criticism from fans, talk-show hosts, broadcasters, and even his own manager. Tony La Russa, while maintaining that Pujols made the remarks in the heat of the moment, said "It's not a good statement. Glavine deserves credit." Tom Glavine, when asked, merely said that everyone is entitled to their own opinion. His teammate Billy Wagner, on the other hand, said:
 			
"I know if Albert would have said that about me, I wouldn't have been as veteraned, as seasoned about it ... I probably would have said something back. That's me. Tom is classy all the way ... Tom's done so much. Tom doesn't have to stoop to tell people how good he is ... His numbers speak for themselves. With 290 wins for somebody that has been in the league as long as he has is pretty self-explanatory ...Tommy's stature is much bigger than Pujols'. He's [got] a Hall of Fame induction coming. Albert doesn't. Albert's a great player, but you just don't know about tomorrow. In this clubhouse, Tommy is the epitome of class and great leadership. He leads by what he does in the field. He doesn't lead by what he says in the media."

Game 2
Friday, October 13, 2006 at Shea Stadium in Queens, New York

In Game 2, the Cardinals erased three deficits en route to a 9–6 victory. In the first inning, Carlos Delgado hit a three-run home run off the Cardinals' ace Chris Carpenter. Yadier Molina then drove in two runs with a bases-loaded double in the second inning off of John Maine. In the bottom of the second, Endy Chavez hit a leadoff double, moved to third on a groundout and scored on José Reyes's, but Jim Edmonds's home run after a walk tied the game in the third. Delgado's home run in the fifth put the Mets back on top 5–4. Next inning, Cardinals reliever Josh Hancock walked Reyes, who scored on Paul Lo Duca's double, but Scott Spiezio, who started the game at third base in place of an injured Scott Rolen, had two hits and three RBIs, including a two-run triple on an 0–2 pitch in the seventh inning to tie the game at six off of Guillermo Mota. Lefty closer Billy Wagner came into the game in the top of the ninth inning. Left fielder Chris Duncan, a lefty hitter, was due to lead off, so, Duncan was pulled in favor of So Taguchi, a right-hitting outfielder who was a better defensive option than Duncan. Taguchi homered on the ninth pitch of the at-bat to put the Cardinals ahead, 7–6. Albert Pujols doubled and moved to third on a groundout before Spiezio's RBI double and Juan Encarnación's single extended the Cardinals' lead to 9–6. Tyler Johnson and Adam Wainwright retired the Mets in order in the bottom of the ninth as the Cardinals' win tied the series 1–1.

Game 3
Saturday, October 14, 2006 at Busch Stadium (III) in St. Louis, Missouri

Back in St. Louis for the next three games, St. Louis starter Jeff Suppan pitched eight innings as the Cardinals defeated the Mets, 5–0. Scott Spiezio hit a two-run triple (his second two-run triple in as many games) in the bottom of the first inning to put the Cardinals ahead, 2–0. The Cardinals loaded the bases on two walks afterward, but Mets starter Steve Trachsel struck out Yadier Molina looking to end the inning. Next inning, Suppan's leadoff home run made it 3–0, who then loaded the bases on two walks and a line drive off the bat of Preston Wilson that hit Trachsel, who left with a bruised thigh. Mets reliever Darren Oliver threw a wild pitch to Jim Edmonds that let David Eckstein score before Edmonds's RBI groundout plated the last run of the game. Oliver then pitched six shutout innings. After the game, the Mets had not scored in 12 consecutive innings, making it 14 before scoring in the third inning of Game 4.

Game 4
Sunday, October 15, 2006 at Busch Stadium (III) in St. Louis, Missouri

Game 4 was a pivotal game for the Mets, who were faced with a two-games-to-one deficit. They sent Óliver Pérez, a young lefty picked up at the trade deadline from the Pittsburgh Pirates, to face the Cardinals' own young starter, Anthony Reyes. In a game that would see an NLCS-record-tying seven home runs, the Cardinals grabbed an early lead in the bottom of the second on a Yadier Molina single. It seemed to be a repeat of the night before, but in the top of the third the Mets hit two home runs, one being Carlos Beltrán's second of the series and sixth against the Cardinals in NLCS play, and another representing David Wright's first hit of the series and first homer of the playoffs. The lead was short-lived, as Scott Spiezio walked with one out, then scored on Juan Encarnación's two-out triple to tie the game. The game would stay tied until the top of the fifth inning, when Paul Lo Duca reached on an error by Cardinals second baseman Ronnie Belliard, Beltrán managed a walk, and Carlos Delgado scored an opposite-field three-run homer, his third of the series, to make it 5–2 Mets and knock starter Brad Thompson out of the game. David Eckstein pulled the Cards back in the bottom of the fifth with a leadoff homer, but, in the top of the sixth, the Mets extended the lead. José Reyes and Paul Lo Duca hit back-to-back singles off of Josh Hancock, and Beltrán walked to load the bases. Delgado then hit a ground-rule double to drive in two runs, and then Wright walked. Tyler Johnson relieved Hancock and Shawn Green singled to drive in one run and José Valentín, who, at that point, was only 3-for-20 in the playoffs, hit a bases-clearing double down the left field line to make it 11–3. The Cardinals got home runs from Edmonds and Molina to make it an 11–5 game, but Mets manager Willie Randolph then pulled starter Pérez and bought in submarine pitcher Chad Bradford to try and limit the damage. Beltrán would tie the NLCS record of seven home runs with another in the seventh off of Braden Looper en route to a final score of 12–5. Beltrán also tied Babe Ruth for the all-time postseason record of seven home runs against the Cardinals, having hit four against them in the 2004 National League Championship Series while playing for the Houston Astros.

Game 5
Tuesday, October 17, 2006 at Busch Stadium (III) in St. Louis, Missouri

After Game 5 was pushed back a day by rain, giving their starter now four days' normal rest instead of three days' short rest, the Mets sought a 3–2 lead in the NLCS. However, pitcher Tom Glavine could not stifle the Cardinals' offense. After the Mets jumped out to a 2–0 lead on Jose Valentin's double off of Jeff Weaver, the next half-inning Albert Pujols struck for his first home run and RBI of the series to cut the Mets' lead in half. Glavine then walked Scott Rolen and allowed a single to Jim Edmonds before Ronnie Belliard tied the game with a single to left. David Eckstein singled to lead off the fifth and scored on Preston Wilson double to put the Cardinals up 3–2. St. Louis padded their lead in the sixth through a pinch-hit home run by rookie Chris Duncan off of Pedro Feliciano that made the final score 4–2, Cardinals. The win moved the Cardinals within one of their second National League pennant in three years.

Game 6
Wednesday, October 18, 2006 at Shea Stadium in Queens, New York

Facing elimination, the Mets sent John Maine to start Game 6. He allowed no runs in  innings, earning the win for the Mets. José Reyes hit a leadoff home run in the bottom of the first, giving the Mets a lead that would never be relinquished. Reyes became the first Met to lead off with a home run in the first inning of a postseason game since former outfielder Lenny Dykstra in Game 3 of the 1986 World Series against the Boston Red Sox. The Cardinals stranded several runners against Maine. In the top of the first inning, with runners on second and third and one out, Maine struck out Jim Edmonds. After Maine hit Juan Encarnación with a pitch to load the bases, Scott Rolen flew out. In the top of the third, with a runner on second and nobody out, Maine struck out Scott Spiezio and intentionally walked Albert Pujols. Edmonds then flew out and Maine struck out Encarnación to finish the job. Shawn Green hit an RBI single in the fourth off of starter Chris Carpenter and Paul Lo Duca added two more with an RBI hit in the seventh off of Braden Looper. Billy Wagner came on in the ninth and allowed a leadoff single to Juan Encarnación and subsequent double to Scott Rolen. After retiring the next two batters, Wagner gave up a two-RBI double to So Taguchi before retiring David Eckstein to end the game.

Game 7

Thursday, October 19, 2006 at Shea Stadium in Queens, New York

In the decisive Game 7, the Mets sent Game 4 winner Óliver Pérez to the mound against Jeff Suppan. The Mets jumped out to an early 1–0 lead when David Wright drove in Carlos Beltrán in the first with a bloop single into right field. The Cardinals tied the game in the second when Ronnie Belliard hit into a squeeze play that scored Jim Edmonds from third. In the fifth, with runners on first and second and two gone, Albert Pujols came up to the plate. Even with Chad Bradford warming up in the bullpen, Willie Randolph decided to stay with Pérez. He got Pujols to pop out. Pérez ran into some more trouble in the sixth with a runner on and one out when Scott Rolen hit a long fly ball to left field to create one of the greatest defensive plays in postseason history.

The ball cleared the fence, but Endy Chávez amazingly brought it back by snow-coning the ball, jumping from the edge of the warning track to snag what looked to be a certain home run. He then threw the ball to first base quickly to double off Jim Edmonds, who had rounded second on his way to third, to end the inning. He received two curtain calls from the Shea crowd. With the bases loaded and one out in the bottom of the sixth, José Valentín and Chávez failed to get the go-ahead run in.

With the score 1–1 in the top of the ninth, Yadier Molina, with a man on-base, hit a deep fly off Aaron Heilman in the same general direction as the one Rolen hit in the sixth. This ball was hit too high for Chávez to catch, and it gave the Cardinals a 3–1 lead, with only three outs in the bottom of the ninth separating them from a pennant.

However, the Mets would not go quietly. Rookie closer Adam Wainwright yielded singles to Valentín and Chávez to lead off the ninth. After getting a strikeout and a fly-out, Wainwright walked Paul Lo Duca to bring up Carlos Beltrán with the bases loaded. Down 0–2 to the rookie Wainwright, Beltrán looked at a curveball on the outside corner at the knees for a called strike three to end the series.

This was the last playoff game played in Shea Stadium and the last postseason appearance for the Mets until 2015, six years after Citi Field opened. It was the second and last time that a visiting team won a postseason series at Shea (the other being the Yankees' victory over the Mets in the 2000 World Series).

Composite box
2006 NLCS (4–3): St. Louis Cardinals over New York Mets

Aftermath
The Cardinals would win the World Series by defeating the heavily-favored Detroit Tigers in five games. With 83 wins, the Cardinals set a record for the worst regular season win–loss total for any championship team. They would win another World Series in 2011 and make another World Series appearance in 2013 (where they lost to the Boston Red Sox). Manager Tony La Russa retired after the 2011 season, going out a champion. LaRussa would unretire ten years later in 2021 when he became the manager of the White Sox, a team he managed from 1979-1986.

As for the Mets, many commentators and fans had predicted that 2006 would be the beginning of a dynasty. They had dominated the National League that season, winning 97 games when no one else won more than 88, and they had a deep and young core, with Beltran, Wright, and Reyes being under 30 (the latter two being under 25). Supporting those three were Hall of Fame caliber players such as Carlos Delgado, Tom Glavine, Pedro Martínez, and Billy Wagner.

Nonetheless, 2006 stands as the only major achievement for this group. They suffered a historic collapse at the end of the 2007 season, losing 12 of their final 17 games to blow a 7-game division lead and miss the postseason by one game. After a smaller late-season collapse the next season (-game division lead with 17 games left), they again missed the postseason by one game. 2008 also marked the Mets final year at Shea Stadium. Following this, they suffered through several losing seasons and ultimately would not return to the postseason until 2015 - in which they won their fifth NL Pennant in franchise history - when Wright was the only Met from 2006 still on the roster. Manager Willie Randolph was fired in the middle of the 2008 season, Delgado played his last game in 2009, General Manager Omar Minaya was fired after 2010 (In 2017, he was brought back as a Special Assistant to then-General Manager Sandy Alderson), Beltran was dealt away at the 2011 trade deadline, and Reyes left via free agency that offseason. Reyes would eventually return to the Mets in 2016; he, along with Wright, would leave the Mets after the 2018 season - Reyes's contract was not renewed, and Wright retired as a result of spinal stenosis.

Despite the loss, Endy Chavez became somewhat of a cult hero for his game-saving catch in Game 7.  Mets' radio broadcaster Gary Cohen called it “not just the play of the year, but the maybe the play of the franchise’s history."

In 2022, Adam Wainwright and Yadier Molina, who were the battery that closed out the 2006 NLCS, broke the record for most games started by a starting pitcher and catcher. For the rest of their careers following the 2006 NLCS, both men were booed in New York when playing the Mets for their heroic roles in Game 7.

See also
2006 St. Louis Cardinals season

Notes

External links

2006 NLCS box scores and play-by-play at Retrosheet
2006 NLCS statistics at Baseball Reference
"Cardinals win unlikely pennant", ESPN.com
"Seventh Heaven", Sports Illustrated

National League Championship Series
National League Championship Series
St. Louis Cardinals postseason
New York Mets postseason
National League Championship Series
National League Championship Series
2000s in St. Louis
National League Championship Series
Sports competitions in New York City
Sports competitions in St. Louis
Sports in Queens, New York
2000s in Queens